Atlético Futebol Polivalente aka Polivalente do Kwanza Sul is an Angolan sports club from the city of Sumbe, in the Angolan southern province of Kwanza Sul.
The team made its debut in the Gira Angola (Angola's second division championship) in 2016 after winning the Kwanza Sul province football championship.

Achievements
Angolan League: 0

Angolan Cup: 0

Angolan SuperCup: 0

Gira Angola: 0

Kwanza Sul provincial championship: 1
 2015

League & Cup Positions

Schedule & results

Manager history

Players

See also
Girabola
Gira Angola

References

External links
 Facebook profile

Football clubs in Angola
Sports clubs in Angola